The Dutch Eredivisie in the 1964–65 season was contested by 16 teams. Feijenoord won the championship.

Teams

A total of 16 teams are taking part in the league.

League standings

Results

See also
 1964–65 Eerste Divisie
 1964–65 Tweede Divisie

References

 Eredivisie official website - info on all seasons 
 RSSSF

Eredivisie seasons
Netherlands
1964–65 in Dutch football